Clinton is a town in Dutchess County, New York, United States. The population was 4,037 in the 2020 census, down from 4,312 in the 2010 census.

History

The current boundaries of the town of Clinton were set in 1821. The general area was part of a British land grant in 1697 known as the Great Nine Partners Patent. In 1734, a soil survey was done in the Great Nine Partners patent running in 1 1/2 mile wide strips from the Hudson River east through the patent. The particular strip running at the bottom of the patent including the future hamlet of Clinton Corners was classified as good land.  

In 1737, the patents were reorganized into precincts, with the current town of Clinton being part of the Charlotte precinct from 1762 until 1788, when the Dutchess County Legislature reorganized the precincts into towns; Clinton was formed from parts of Charlotte and Rhinebeck precincts, and named in commemoration of the service of Governor George Clinton. In 1821, the current boundaries were set when the towns of Pleasant Valley and Hyde Park were created out of the larger Clinton town.

The early European settlers in Clinton filtered in from two primary directions. In the early 1700s, Rhinebeck was the largest settlement in Dutchess County, taking advantage of the Hudson River for transportation of people and produce.  Across Dutchess County to the east the settlements of Amenia and Wassaic in the Harlem River valley were also attracting European settlers. In 1718, a road was established branching off from the central Wassaic-Poughkeepsie road to connect to the northern Amenia-Rhinbeck road at the Crum Elbow Creek crossing. 

In 1748, the road commissioners from Rhinebeck and Crum Elbow precincts met at the bridge over Crum Elbow Creek to discuss the "old wissasiek road" which had been in existence for 30 years.  One of those commissioners was Mordecai Lester. His home and his son's home were mentioned in the commission's report as landmarks along the road north and south of the hamlet of Clinton Corners.

In addition to the early Dutch and English settlers, by the mid 1700s German Palatines were moving into the western regions of Clinton. By the 1770s Quakers were moving up into Clinton from the southeast.

Clinton participated in the Civil War, with men enlisting in the 128th and 150th regiments. After the war ended, dairy farmers brought their milk by wagon to the creamery in the hamlet of Clinton Corners by the tracks of the Poughkeepsie and Eastern Railway. This rail line continued to the Grove Amusement Park at the southeast end of Upton Lake and the ice house at the northeast end of the lake. After the railway declined with the advent of the automobile, the park closed. During the second half of the 20th century, the town of Clinton transformed from an agricultural into a residential center.

Geography

The Taconic State Parkway passes through the town.

Demographics

As of the census of 2000, there were 4,010 people, 1,502 households, and 1,120 families residing in the town.  The population density was 104.3 people per square mile (40.3/km2).  There were 1,734 housing units at an average density of 45.1 per square mile (17.4/km2).  The racial makeup of the town was 96.03% White, 1.60% African American, 0.35% Native American, 1.02% Asian, 0.22% from other races, and 0.77% from two or more races. Hispanic or Latino people of any race were 1.75% of the population.

There were 1,502 households, out of which 34.3% had children under the age of 18 living with them, 65.1% were married couples living together, 6.6% had a female householder with no husband present, and 25.4% were non-families. 19.2% of all households were made up of individuals, and 6.9% had someone living alone who was 65 years of age or older.  The average household size was 2.63 and the average family size was 3.02.

In the town, the population was spread out, with 24.7% under the age of 18, 4.1% from 18 to 24, 29.8% from 25 to 44, 30.0% from 45 to 64, and 11.4% who were 65 years of age or older.  The median age was 41 years. For every 100 females, there were 100.2 males.  For every 100 females age 18 and over, there were 98.6 males.

The median income for a household in the town was $66,406, and the median income for a family was $71,908. Males had a median income of $45,511 versus $32,750 for females. The per capita income for the town was $29,565.  About 3.4% of families and 3.7% of the population were below the poverty line, including 1.9% of those under age 18 and 4.0% of those age 65 or over.

Communities in Clinton 
Bulls Head – A hamlet in the northeast of the town
Clinton Corners – A hamlet in the southeast of the town
Clinton Hollow – A hamlet in the south center of the town
Frost Mills – A hamlet near the center of western town line
Hibernia – A hamlet in the south east corner of the town
Pleasant Plains – A hamlet in the central western section of the town
Schultzville – A hamlet in the northern central section of the town

Notable people 

 Amy Goldman Fowler, (b. 1954); billionaire heiress
 Savannah Guthrie (b. 1971); broadcast journalist and attorney
 Zephyr Teachout (b. 1971); attorney, professor, and politician

See also

Wild Hive Farm

References

McDermott, William. Clinton: Dutchess County, NY: A History of a Town (1987).

External links
Town of Clinton official website
Clinton Community Library

Poughkeepsie–Newburgh–Middletown metropolitan area
Towns in Dutchess County, New York
Dutchess